Xanthorrhoea caespitosa, commonly known as sand-heath grasstree, is a species of grasstree of the genus Xanthorrhoea native to South Australia.

The perennial grass tree is found in the south east of South Australia. and the south of the Northern Territory

References

Asparagales of Australia
caespitosa
Flora of South Australia
Plants described in 1986